The Julian-Drew Building is a historic building in Tucson, Arizona. It was built in 1937 by A.C. Rosewell for businessmen William Armine Julian and W. E. Drew. Tenants included a car dealership called the Tucson Overland Company and a hotel called the Lewis Hotel. The building has been listed on the National Register of Historic Places since March 29, 1996.

References

National Register of Historic Places in Pima County, Arizona
Commercial buildings completed in 1937
1937 establishments in Arizona